Nokia's Series 80 (formerly Crystal) was a short-lived mobile software platform for their enterprise and professional level smartphones, introduced in 2000. It uses the Symbian OS. Common physical properties of this Symbian OS user interface platform are a screen resolution of 640×200 pixels and a full QWERTY keyboard. Series 80 used the large size of the Communicator screens to good effect, but software had to be developed specifically for it, for a relatively small market.

The final Series 80 device was the Nokia 9300i, announced in 2005 and shipped in 2006. Nokia used S60 3rd Edition instead of the Series 80 platform on its final "Communicator" branded device, the Nokia E90 Communicator, released in 2007.

Features
 Support for editing popular office documents
 Full QWERTY keyboard
 Integrated mouse for navigation
 SSL/TLS support
 Full web browser based on Opera
 VPN support

Devices

S80 v1.0:
 Jun 2001 – Nokia 9210 Communicator
 Jun 2001 – Nokia 9290 Communicator
 May 2002 – Nokia 9210i Communicator

S80 v2.0:
 Feb 2005 – Nokia 9500 Communicator
 Jul 2005 – Nokia 9300 (not branded as "Communicator")
 Mar 2006 – Nokia 9300i (not branded as "Communicator")

References

Smartphones
Mobile software
Embedded operating systems
Series 80